Ostrya carpinifolia, the European hop-hornbeam, is a tree in the family Betulaceae. It is the only species of the genus Ostrya that is native to Europe.

Distribution 

Ostrya carpinifolia is found in Lebanon, Italy, France, Austria, Slovenia, Albania, Croatia, Bosnia and Herzegovina, Serbia, Montenegro, North Macedonia, Greece, Bulgaria, southern Switzerland and Turkey.
It is found in the medium elevations, in southern Italy and Sicily, in the South Apennine mixed montane forests ecoregion of the Mediterranean forests, woodlands, and scrub Biome.

Description 
It has a conical or irregular crown and a scaly, rough bark, and alternate and double-toothed birch-like leaves 3–10 cm long.

Uses 
The wood is very heavy and hard, and was historically used to fashion plane soles.

Ostrya are used as food plants by the larvae of some Lepidoptera species.

External links 
 GRIN database: Ostrya carpinifolia
 Scheda botanica: Ostrya carpinifolia
 Ostrya carpinifolia - information, genetic conservation units and related resources. European Forest Genetic Resources Programme (EUFORGEN)

carpinifolia
Flora of Europe
Flora of the Caucasus
Flora of Western Asia
Plants described in 1772
Trees of Mediterranean climate
Flora of Central Europe
Flora of Southeastern Europe
Taxa named by Giovanni Antonio Scopoli